SFAS is an acronym that may refer to:

Special Forces Assessment and Selection
Statements of Financial Accounting Standards